Clyde Rucker (born May 23, 1963) is an American entrepreneur and businessman who currently serves as Chief Executive Officer (CEO) of Rucker Restaurant Holdings. As of 2019, he owns 80 Jack in the Box  and Denny's restaurants in Arizona and Texas.

Rucker, was formally a member of the 100 Black Men of America and held a seat on the Board of Trustees of the Florida Memorial University. As of 2016, he holds a seat on the Board of Directors for the Valero Alamo Bowl.

Early life and education 
Rucker was born in Fort Sill, Oklahoma in a military family. He is a 1981 Graduate of Gateway High School in Aurora, Colorado and earned a bachelor's degree in Ethnic Studies from the University of Colorado Boulder in 1984. After serving in the U.S. Army, Rucker graduated in 1990 with a Master's of Science degree from Central Michigan University.

Career 
After serving in the United States Army, where he achieved the rank of captain in the Inactive Ready Reserve, Rucker joined Ford Motor Company as a zone manager. Later, he accepted a position at KFC, owned by PepsiCo at that time. Rucker then served a senior executive at Burger King for 12 years. After the company went public in 2007, Rucker joined former Burger King Chairman/CEO Greg Brenneman at Quiznos, as an Executive Vice President, later President of International, and COO. Rucker values his years on the franchisor side, which allowed him to work from the bottom up, helping him to become a well rounded, successful franchisee. “Working for a franchisor was an intermediate goal to gain a lot of learning, as well as to excel in a corporate environment. I enjoyed it tremendously and what it did, both directly and indirectly, was give me the opportunity to understand the true definition of a good franchisee and a good business model.”

In 2010, Rucker saw the right opportunity to become a franchisee for a real blue-chip brand and formed Rucker Restaurant Holdings in Phoenix. As of January 2019, Rucker Restaurant Holdings manages over 80 restaurants in both the Jack in the Box and Denny's brands in Arizona and Texas.

References

American businesspeople
Living people
1963 births